The 1980 Syracuse Orangemen football team represented Syracuse University during the 1980 NCAA Division I-A football season. The team was led by seventh-year head coach Frank Maloney and played their home games in the newly constructed Carrier Dome in Syracuse, New York. Syracuse finished the season with a 5–6 record. At the conclusion of the season, head coach Frank Maloney resigned, with a record of 32–46 after seven seasons.

Schedule

Roster

Season summary

at Ohio State

References

Syracuse
Syracuse Orange football seasons
Syracuse Orangemen football